The 2016–17 Biathlon World Cup – World Cup 2 was held in Pokljuka, Slovenia, from 9 December until 11 December 2016.

Schedule of events

Medal winners

Men

Women

References 

2016–17 Biathlon World Cup
Biathlon World Cup - World Cup 2
Biathlon World Cup - World Cup 2
Biathlon competitions in Slovenia